Bob Spitz is an American journalist and author best known for biographies of major cultural figures, including Reagan: An American Journey, the New York Times bestseller The Beatles: The Biography, the New York Times bestseller Dearie: The Remarkable Life of Julia Child, and books about Bob Dylan, and the Woodstock festival.

Articles by Spitz appear regularly in The New York Times Magazine, GQ, Conde Nast Traveler, Men's Journal, In Style, Esquire and The Washington Post.

In his early career he worked as a manager for Bruce Springsteen and Elton John, beginning at Wes Farrell's Pocket Full of Tunes, a music publishing and production company. When Mike Appel signed Bruce Springsteen, Spitz followed Appel.

Spitz lives in New York.

Nonfiction books
 Reagan: An American Journey (Penguin Press, 2018-10-02)
 Dearie: The Remarkable Life of Julia Child (end notes available on author's site) (Alfred A. Knopf, 2012-08-07)
 The Saucier's Apprentice: One Long Strange Trip through the Great Cooking Schools of Europe (W. W. Norton and Company, 2008)
 The Beatles: The Biography (Little, Brown and Company, 2005)
 Barefoot in Babylon: The Creation of the Woodstock Music Festival, 1969 (W. W. Norton and Company, 1989)
 Dylan: A Biography (McGraw-Hill, 1988)
 The Making of Superstars: Artists and Executives of the Rock Music Business (Anchor Press, 1978)
 Led Zeppelin: The Biography (2021)

Juvenile nonfiction books
 Yeah! Yeah! Yeah!: The Beatles, Beatlemania, and the Music that Changed the World (Little, Brown and Company, 2007)

References

Living people
American male journalists
American biographers
Year of birth missing (living people)
American male biographers